Chaoyang railway station can refer to:

Chaoyang railway station (Guangdong) (潮阳站), a station in Shantou, Guangdong province, China
Beijing Chaoyang railway station (北京朝阳站), a station in Chaoyang District, Beijing, China
Liaoning Chaoyang railway station (辽宁朝阳站), a station in Chaoyang, Liaoning province, China

See also
Chaoyang station, a metro station in Hangzhou, Zhejiang Province, China